Beach Handball has been a Bolivarian Beach Games event since 2012 in Lima, Peru.

Men

Summary

Medal table

Participating nations

Women

Summary

Medal table

Participating nations

References

External links
 www.panamhandball.org

 

Beach handball at multi-sport events
Sports at the Bolivarian Games